Speroni is an Italian surname. Notable people with the surname include:
 
 Carlo Speroni (1895–1969), Italian runner
 Francesco Speroni (born 1946), Italian politician
 Julián Speroni (born 1979), Argentinian footballer
 Remo Speroni (1938–2010), stage name Remo Germani, Italian singer 
 Sperone Speroni (1500–1588), Italian humanist playwright

Italian-language surnames